Kapital Bank is a commercial bank operating in Azerbaijan. Founded in 1874 as Azerbaijan Savings Bank, it is headquartered in Baku.

History
The bank was founded on July 24, 1874. The first service point of Kapital Bank, which is the legal successor of Savings Bank of Azerbaijan, started to function as from July 24, 1874. For the first time, savings banks began their activity under Baku city branch of the State Bank of the Russian Empire. The Executive Manager of the branch was Ivan Samsonovich Khandojevsky.

After the proclamation of Azerbaijan Democratic Republic, Azerbaijan State Bank opened on September 30, 1919 and the activity of savings banks was restored on December 1, 1919.

On April 28, 1920, after the collapse of the ADR, the activity of the Baku branch of the Russian State Bank was suspended by the decree of the Revolutionary Committee of Azerbaijan dated June 9, 1920. In January of 1924, State Labour Savings Banks, operating under the State Bank of Azerbaijan SSR, were established. In 1988, these banks were merged into Azerbaijan Republican Bank of Savings Bank of the USSR. On February 11, 1992, Saving Bank of the Republic of Azerbaijan was formed on the basis of this Bank. On 21 February 2000, the merger of Savings Bank, Azerbaijan Agro-Industrial Bank and Azerbaijan Industrial Investment Bank resulted in the establishment of Azerbaijan United Universal Stock Bank (BUSBank).

On December 29, 2004, at the meeting of bank shareholders, it was decided to change the name of BUSBank to "Kapital Bank".

99.87% of shares of "Kapital Bank" OJSC belong to PASHA Holding. The share capital of the Bank is 185 million AZN. Kapital Bank is a financial institution with the largest service network in Azerbaijan and has 102 branches and 20 departments.

Kapital Bank is a universal bank and serves physical and corporate clients. The bank serves more than 3 million individuals and more than 22,000 legal entities. At the same time, Kapital Bank closely participates in a number of state-owned social projects and implements a number of development programs of real sector.

Rating
In 2012, Kapital Bank was awarded ratings by international rating agencies Fitch Ratings and Moody's. Fitch agency gave the Kapital Bank a long-term "B+" rating, defined the bank's rating forecast as "stable". The short-term rating was "B", the support rating was "4". Moody's Investors Service has determined the long-term rating of the Kapital Bank's foreign currency deposits at the level of "Ba3", the financial support rating at the level of "E+". All ratings have a "stable" forecast.

Supervisory Board
 Chairman of the Supervisory Board - Jalal Alakbar Oglu Gasimov
 Member of the Supervisory Board - Farid Usad Mammadov
 Member of the Supervisory Board - Rauf Yusif Oglu Hajiyev
 Member of the Supervisory Board - Kamala Hasan Gizi Nuriyeva
 Member of the Supervisory Board - Ogtay Arif Oglu Hasanov

Audit Committee
 Chairman of the Audit committee - Parvin Shirali Oghlu Ahadzade
 Member of Audit Committee - Murad Faig Oghlu Ahmadov
 Member of Audit Committee - Jamil Vahid Mammadov

Management
 Chairman of the board - Allahverdiyev Rovshan Shamil (since 10 June 2013)
 First Deputy Chairman of the board - Huseynov Farid Arif
 Deputy Chairman of the board of Directors, Chief Information Officer - Zeynalov Nahid Vidadi
 Deputy Chairman of the board - Yashar Zeynalabdi Mammadov
 Member of the Board, Chief Financial Officer - Emin Agaverdi Mammadov

See also

 Banking in Azerbaijan
 Central Bank of Azerbaijan
 List of banks in Azerbaijan
 Azerbaijani manat
 Economy of Azerbaijan

References

External links

Government of Azerbaijan
Economy of Azerbaijan
Banks of Azerbaijan
Banks established in 2000
2000 establishments in Azerbaijan
Azerbaijani brands